The Embassy of Peru in Madrid is the foremost diplomatic mission of Peru in Spain.

Both countries officially established relations on August 15, 1879, under Alfonso XII and have since maintained diplomatic relations with a brief exception during the years 1936 to 1939 as a result of the Spanish blockade of the embassy during the Spanish Civil War due to the influx of refugees at the time.

Spain also maintains an Embassy in Lima, headed by its Ambassador, Alejandro Alvargonzález San Martín.

References

Peru
Madrid
Peru–Spain relations